Before We Explode is a Canadian sex comedy film, directed by Rémi St-Michel and released in 2019. The film stars Étienne Galloy as Pier-Luc, a teenager who fears that the diplomatic war of words between Donald Trump and Kim Jong-un is going to escalate into World War III, and embarks on a quest to lose his virginity before the world blows up.

The film's cast also includes Amadou Madani Tall, William Monette, Julianne Côté, Monia Chokri, Brigitte Poupart, Antoine Olivier Pilon, and Rose-Marie Perreault.

The film premiered in February 2019 at the Rendez-vous Québec Cinéma. It received two Prix Iris nominations at the 21st Quebec Cinema Awards, for Best Screenplay (Éric K. Boulianne) and Best Original Music (Peter Venne).

References

External links
 

2019 films
2010s sex comedy films
Canadian sex comedy films
2010s French-language films
2019 comedy films
Apocalyptic films
French-language Canadian films
2010s Canadian films